The 1916 Grand Prix season saw Grand Prix motor racing continue in the United States. Racing was suspended in Europe due to the World War I engulfing the continent. Once again European cars dominated Indianapolis with victory going to Briton Dario Resta in a Peugeot. With the organisers wanting to appeal to the spectators, this was the only year that the race was scheduled for a shorter length – to run only 300 miles.
The Vanderbilt Cup and the American Grand Prize returned to Santa Monica, California at the end of the year. Resta repeated his victory from the year before, winning the Vanderbilt Cup. Then when he retired in the Grand Prize it was Howdy Wilcox and Johnny Aitken who won in another of the dominant Peugeots. Oval courses now dominated the AAA Championship with these two events being the only road-course races this year. It proved to be the final time these two formative American races were held in this format, as the Great War dragged the country into the global chaos in 1917.
With five victories across the season, the AAA national championship would be retroactively awarded to Dario Resta.

Major Races 
Sources:

Regulations and Technical
As the Great War rolled inexorably through its second devastating year across Europe, the only motor-racing of note was the AAA National Championship. Even so, austerity measures limited the American season – with only fifteen events contributing to the championship down from the 27 of the previous year, although there were a number of unofficial events. Organisers of the International Sweepstakes at Indianapolis reduced it to 300 miles for the first and only time in its history, nominally to encourage more entries and incite greater crowd-appeal than the previous 5-6 hour marathons.

This year, for the first time, the AAA instituted a points-system for its championship races. Points were awarded to the top ten cars still running at the end, with more points awarded to longer races in a sliding scale. Drivers only got points for a car they started a race in and if they were relieved during the race, they would score a percentage of points based on the percentage of laps they were in their car.

Once again, the Grand Prize was sanctioned by the Automobile Club of America (ACA). The engine regulations were left unchanged from 1915 – with the Grand Prize and Vanderbilt Cup running to a limit of 450 cu in (7.38 litres) and Indianapolis at 300 cu in (4.92 litres).

Season review

see also 1916 AAA Championship Car season

Only 24 entries arrived for the Indianapolis race and 21 cars took the start (the smallest in the race’s history). The Peugeot Auto Racing team had prepared new cars for Dario Resta, Ralph Mulford, Johnny Aitken and veteran Charlie Merz. Shortly after the end of the 1914 French Grand Prix, Carl Fisher had purchased two of the Peugeot EX-5s and gave them to Premier for three replicas to be made. These were ready for the race and the team hired former Stutz drivers  Howdy Wilcox and Norwegian-American Gil Anderson, as well as Tom Rooney. The cars looked identical to the Peugeots but were noticeably slower. The Premiers and the American Peugeot drivers were all entered by the Indianapolis Speedway Team to bolster the entry numbers.

Duesenberg had cars for Eddie O'Donnell and Wilbur D'Alene although only the latter qualified. Duesenberg also provided the engines for the new Crawford chassis. Eddie Rickenbacker was team leader for Maxwell along with Canadian Pete Henderson. Along with several specials, a new entry were the Frontenacs of the three Chevrolet brothers, Louis and Arthur. Gaston’s car did not qualify for the race. French manufacturer Delage arranged for cars for French driver Jules de Vigne as well as Barney Oldfield and Jack LeCain. The international field was rounded out with Belgian Josef Christiaens running a British Sunbeam and Aldo Franchi in a Peugeot with a Sunbeam engine.

A significant absentee was Ralph DePalma, the 1915 race-winner. He was to run with the new Hudson team but they had submitted their team entries too late while DePalma was haggling with the organisers to get paid appearance money. It was also without Bob Burman, as he and his mechanic had been killed in April when his Peugeot lost a wheel and crashed while leading a non-championship event at Corona, Los Angeles.

Fastest car in qualifying was Johnny Aitken’s Peugeot, with the front row filled out with Rickenbacker and Andersen. From the start it was Rickenbacker who took the lead, holding it for the first nine laps until his steering gave out. Aitken then took the lead for eight laps until he was passed by Resta. From there on the Briton stayed in the front with a trouble-free run after Aitken retired, winning by two minutes from d’Alene’s Duesenberg with Mulford’s Peugeot in third. The race was marred by a serious accident on lap 61 to Jack LeCain that left him critically injured. He had not qualified but was driving as relief for de Vigne when the Delage crashed. His mechanic and a spectator also suffered lesser injuries.

DePalma was present a fortnight later, in his Mercedes GP, at the next event at Maywood oval, Chicago. In a tight wheel-to-wheel battle he duelled with Resta for almost three hours until a sparkplug failed on his engine, giving Resta the win by two minutes. DePalma won the next two rounds with Resta not racing though the British driver then won at the Omaha speedway in an event overshadowed by the deaths of Aldo Franchi and his mechanic. Johnnie Aitken then won four of the next six races to leap into title contention.

This year the Vanderbilt Cup and Grand Prize were held in November, back at Santa Monica where they had been held previously in 1914. They were the only road-races in the championship. Going into the weekend, Aitken (3440 pts) had a 240-point lead over Resta (3200 pts), with Rickenbacker a distant third with 2210 pts. Resta, Aitken and their Peugeots were entered, along with Rickenbacker in Bill Weightman’s Duesenberg but not DePalma. Ira Vail led a trio of Hudsons, Earl Cooper was in his Stutz and Lewis Jackson in a Marmon. Practice was marred by a fatal accident to Harry Horstman, an unofficial entry, on the track without permission. Mike Moosie was fastest in practice in a Duesenberg with Jackson second.

Rickenbacker retired early with a ruined gearbox, while Aitken was out just after the halfway mark with engine problems. This left Resta to win the race comfortably by eight minutes, repeating his victory from the year before. After 200 gruelling miles he was content to drink a pint of milk to celebrate. Second was Earl Cooper’s Stutz with Weightman third and the three Hudsons the only other finishers.

Two days later, most of the same drivers met again for the Grand Prize. Howdy Wilcox was also entered in another Peugeot EX5 along with Cliff Durant in a Stutz (entered by the Chevrolet Motor Company). The 900 points Resta had got for his Vanderbilt Cup victory now put him in front of the points-table, ahead of Aitken who had scored none.

Once again, Mike Moosie was on pole position, and in a sensation Aitken retired after only one lap with a broken piston. On lap 13, there was a tragic accident. Lew Jackson lost control of his Marmon after the bend on the fast back straight. He veered off the road, hitting a palm tree then ploughed into an ice-cream stand. Jackson and three of the public were killed outright, while his mechanic and two other spectators were injured. Six laps later, Resta’s car also broke down when its ignition failed. Then Aitken joined Howdy Wilcox, leading the race, as a relief driver. Unaware of the rule that only the starting driver would score any points (a precedent set with Rickenbacker at the Indianapolis race earlier in the year) Resta was alarmed that he would now lose the championship. He approached Earl Cooper, running second, offering to buy and drive his Stutz “at any price”. But Cooper refused and carried on to finish second behind the Wilcox/Aitken Peugeot. When the officials confirmed that Aitken would not score any points, Resta was relieved.

The final event of the season was held at the end of November. The Ascot Derby was a short 150-mile race held at Ascot, Los Angeles, and with only 700 points for the winner, neither Resta nor Aitken showed up. It was won by Rickenbacker who cemented third place in the points’ standings ahead of DePalma.

In 1917, the United States entered the war and all racing ceased there as well. The AAA season was cancelled halfway through and the Indianapolis speedway was turned over to the government to use. Eddie Rickenbacker would go on to become the United States’ top-scoring flying ace of the war. Johnny Aitken died in 1918, a victim of the influenza epidemic. When racing resumed in 1919 after the Armistice, the world had changed, and it would be without the Vanderbilt Cup and the American Grand Prize. Road-racing faded into obsolescence in the United States for nearly twenty years.

Citations

References
 Cimarosti, Adriano (1997)    The Complete History of Grand Prix Motor Racing    London: Aurum Press Ltd  
 Fox, Charles (1973)    The Great Racing Cars & Drivers    London: Octopus Books Ltd  
 Georgano, Nick (1971)    The Encyclopaedia of Motor Sport    London: Ebury Press Ltd  
 Higham, Peter (1995)    The Guinness Guide to International Motor Racing    London: Guinness Publishing  
 Monkhouse, George (1953)    Grand Prix Racing Facts and Figures   London: G.T. Foulis & Co Ltd
 Rendall, Ivan (1991)    The Power and The Glory – A Century of Motor Racing    London: BBC Books  
 Rendall, Ivan (1993)    The Chequered Flag – 100 years of Motor Racing    London: Weidenfeld & Nicolson Ltd

External links

  Grand Prix Winners 1895–1949 : Part 1 (1895–1916) – list of the races and winners. Retrieved 28 Aug 2019
  Grand Prix Winners 1895–1949 : History – Hans Etzrodt’s description of the annual regulations, and changes. Retrieved 7 Jun 2019
  GEL Motorsport Information Page  - Darren Galpan’s list of the races, entrants and results. Retrieved 6 Sep 2019
  6th Gear  - list of the major races and winners each year. Retrieved 20 Sep 2019
  Motorsport Memorial – motor-racing deaths by year. Retrieved 28 Aug 2019
  1916 AAA Championship – list of all the races, entrants and results of the AAA Championship. Retrieved 20 Sep 2019
  MotorSport magazine – race results of AAA championship. Retrieved 28 Aug 2019
  Vanderbilt Cup Races – race results and report of the Vanderbilt Cup, incl 30-sec video. Retrieved 20 Sep 2019

Grand Prix seasons
1916 in motorsport
 
1916 in American motorsport